Endless Summer: Donna Summer's Greatest Hits is a compilation album by American singer-songwriter Donna Summer, released on November 8, 1994. It contains many of Summer's best known songs, from her 1970s breakthrough to the release of the album. Unlike 1993's The Donna Summer Anthology, which contains the majority of the songs in their original longer forms, Endless Summer generally includes single versions of the songs. However, the version sold in the United Kingdom uses the album version of the track "I Don't Wanna Get Hurt", (from Another Place and Time), not the more club-oriented mix released as a single there.

Endless Summer also features two new tracks, the first of which, "Melody of Love (Wanna Be Loved)", became a moderate hit when released as a single, reaching number one on the US dance charts. Summer was given production credits on the track, which she had written with Robert Clivillés and David Cole of C+C Music Factory. The other new track and second single was the soulful ballad "Any Way at All", which Summer had written with her husband Bruce Sudano. This song was produced by Michael Omartian, who had produced some of Summer's work in the 1980s.

For many years, Endless Summer was regarded as the "definitive" Donna Summer hits CD, as it was the last international non-budget compilation to be released until 2003. A video album with music videos and some live performances was also released simultaneously, in VHS and LD format.

Track listings
The track listing of Endless Summer varied from nation to nation as some of Summer's hits were more popular in certain places than others. For example, "Heaven Knows" and "The Wanderer", big hits in the US, are not featured on the European edition of the album and are replaced with a couple of her 1980s hits that were less successful in the US. In France however, the compilation was not released until the following year and contains the 1995 remix of her 1977 hit "I Feel Love" as a bonus track.

US edition

EU edition
"Melody of Love (Wanna Be Loved)"  (Carrano, Clivillés, Cole, Summer) – 4:16
"Love to Love You Baby" (Bellotte, Moroder, Summer) – 3:21
"Could It Be Magic" (Anderson, Manilow) – 3:55
"I Feel Love" (Bellotte, Moroder, Summer) – 3:46
"Love's Unkind" (Bellotte, Moroder, Summer) – 4:26
"I Love You" (Bellote, Moroder, Summer) – 3:19
"Last Dance" (Jabara) – 3:18
"MacArthur Park"(Webb) – 3:55
"Hot Stuff"  (Bellotte, Faltermeyer, Forsey) – 3:50
"Bad Girls"  (Esposito, Hokenson, Sudano, Summer) – 3:54
"No More Tears (Enough Is Enough)"  – duet with Barbra Streisand (Jabara, Roberts) –  4:48
"On the Radio" (Moroder, Summer) – 4:03
"Love Is in Control (Finger on the Trigger)" (Jones, Ross, Temperton) – 4:19
"State of Independence" (Anderson, Vangelis) – 4:25
"She Works Hard for the Money" (Omartian, Summer) – 4:33
"Unconditional Love" (Omartian, Summer) – 3:57
"This Time I Know It's for Real" (Aitken, Stock, Summer, Waterman) – 3:36
"I Don't Wanna Get Hurt" (Aitken, Stock, Waterman) – 3:26
"Any Way at All" (Silver, Sudano, Summer) – 4:16

France edition (Greatest Hits)
"I Feel Love" ('95 Remix) (Bellotte, Moroder, Summer) – 3:50
"Love to Love You Baby" (Bellotte, Moroder, Summer) – 3:21
"Could It Be Magic" (Anderson, Manilow) – 3:55
"Love's Unkind" (Bellotte, Moroder, Summer) – 4:26
"I Love You" (Bellote, Moroder, Summer) – 3:19
"Last Dance" (Jabara) – 3:18
"MacArthur Park"(Webb) – 3:55
"Hot Stuff"  (Bellotte, Faltermeyer, Forsey) – 3:50
"Bad Girls"  (Esposito, Hokenson, Sudano, Summer) – 3:54
"No More Tears (Enough Is Enough)"  – duet with Barbra Streisand (Jabara, Roberts) –  4:48
"On the Radio" (Moroder, Summer) – 4:03
"Love Is in Control (Finger on the Trigger)" (Jones, Ross, Temperton) – 4:19
"State of Independence" (Anderson, Vangelis) – 4:25
"She Works Hard for the Money" (Omartian, Summer) – 4:33
"Unconditional Love" (Omartian, Summer) – 3:57
"This Time I Know It's for Real" (Aitken, Stock, Summer, Waterman) – 3:36
"I Don't Wanna Get Hurt" (Aitken, Stock, Waterman) – 3:26
"I Feel Love" (Bellotte, Moroder, Summer) – 3:46

Charts and certifications

Weekly charts

Single

Certifications and sales

References

Albums produced by Pete Bellotte
Albums produced by Quincy Jones
Albums produced by Giorgio Moroder
Albums produced by Michael Omartian
1994 greatest hits albums
Donna Summer compilation albums